Mi Zhou may refer to:

Mi Prefecture, a historical prefecture in modern Shandong, China between the 6th and 14th centuries
Zhou Mi (badminton) (born 1979), Chinese female badminton player
Zhou Mi (singer) (born 1986), Chinese recording artist and entertainer